Raymond Arroyo (born September 20, 1970) is an American author, journalist, and producer. He is news director and lead anchor of EWTN News. He created and hosts the news program The World Over Live (which celebrated its 25th anniversary on EWTN in 2021) and authored the Will Wilder series. He also presents the "Seen and Unseen" segment on Fox News Channel's The Ingraham Angle.

Early life 
Arroyo was born in New Orleans, Louisiana and went to Brother Martin High School. He graduated from the Tisch School of the Arts at New York University.  
He has stated on national TV (Fox News) that his father migrated from Central America and served as a U.S. Marine.

Career 

Arroyo worked at the Associated Press, the New York Observer, and for the political columnist team of Evans and Novak. He 
hosts the news program The World Over Live. A Fox News contributor, he is a frequent guest and occasional substitute host on The Ingraham Angle. He has been featured on such television shows as The Today Show, Good Morning America, Access Hollywood, The O'Reilly Factor,  and CNN Headline News

Writing 
Arroyo's biography of EWTN's founder, Mother Angelica, was a 2007 New York Times bestseller, as were each of Arroyo's following books. He is also the editor of Mother Angelica's Little Book of Life Lessons and Everyday Spirituality (2007 Doubleday), Mother Angelica's Private and Pithy Lessons from the Scriptures (2008 Doubleday), The Prayers and Personal Devotions of Mother Angelica (2010 Doubleday), co-author of, Of Thee I Zing: America's Cultural Decline from Muffin Tops to Body Shots (2011 Threshold Editions) and a series of children's books; Will Wilder: The Relic of Perilous Falls (2017), Will Wilder: The Lost Staff of Wonders (2018 Random House/Crown) and Will Wilder: The Amulet of Power (2019). The Spider Who Saved Christmas was published in 2020 by Sophia Institute Press.

His writings have been published by Newsweek, The Wall Street Journal, The Washington Times, The Financial Times, and National Catholic Register.

Personal life 
Arroyo resides in New Orleans, Louisiana, with his wife Rebecca and their three children.

Books

References

External links 

 
 

Living people
1970 births
American Roman Catholics
American radio journalists
Catholics from Louisiana
Fox News people
Hispanic and Latino American people in television
Hispanic and Latino American writers
Roman Catholic writers
Tisch School of the Arts alumni
Writers from New Orleans
Writers from Virginia
Latino conservatism in the United States